The Cornelius Tappen House, also known as the Vandenburgh-Hasbrouck House is located in the Kingston Stockade District in Kingston, New York.

Designed and built as a salt-box style house, the Tappen building was constructed with uncut stones, an example of a "rubble" house. It was built sometime before the American Revolution, burned in 1777, and rebuilt later.

In 1777, during the American Revolutionary War, the Tappen was home to many of Kingston's oldest records. When the British came and tragically burned the city to the ground, Kingston was lucky to have Cornelius Tappen, the county clerk, who put his own safety aside and rescued the town records from the fire.

Following the 1777 fire the house was rebuilt and became Kingston's first post office.

Throughout the years the Tappen house was passed through many families until the 1970s. Slated for demolition as part of uptown urban development, the house was rescued by Heritage Savings bank who restored the building for use as a banking facility.

References

External links
Vandenburgh-Hasbrouck House, 10 Crown Street, Kingston, Ulster County, NY - 5 photos, 13 drawings, and 11 data pages from the Historic American Buildings Survey
 'The Tappen'

Kingston, New York
Houses in Ulster County, New York
Houses completed in 1670
1670 establishments in the Province of New York